Mount Goddard is a mountain of California's Sierra Nevada, in the north section of Kings Canyon National Park. Goddard forms the southwest boundary of the Evolution Basin.

The peak is named for civil engineer George Henry Goddard, who surveyed the Sierra Nevada during the 1850s. The name was given by William Brewer's California Geological Survey party in 1864, during which year they made two unsuccessful attempts to climb the mountain.

Fifteen years later, Lilbourne Winchell and Louis Davis completed the first recorded ascent on September 23, 1879. They scrambled up class 2 rock from the east side of Martha Lake to Goddard Col, and a lake and chute beyond. From here they attained the summit by way of the Southwest Ridge, and a short class 3 ridge between the two summits of Mount Goddard.

References

External links 
 
 

Mountains of Kings Canyon National Park
Mountains of Fresno County, California
Mountains of Northern California